Gino Pancino (born 11 April 1943) is a retired Italian amateur track cyclist. Competing in the 4000 m team pursuit he won a world title in 1966 and placed second at the 1967 World Championships and third at the 1968 Olympics.

References

External links
 

1943 births
Living people
Italian male cyclists
Olympic cyclists of Italy
Olympic bronze medalists for Italy
Olympic medalists in cycling
Cyclists at the 1968 Summer Olympics
People from Pordenone
Medalists at the 1968 Summer Olympics
Cyclists from Friuli Venezia Giulia